Sette scialli di seta gialla/ Seven Shawls of Yellow Silk (International title: Crimes of the Black Cat) is a 1972 Italian giallo film. It was directed by Sergio Pastore and written by Pastore, Alessandro Continenza and Giovanni Simonelli. Sette scialli di seta gialla stars Anthony Steffen, Sylva Koscina, Jeannette Len, Renato De Carmine, Giacomo Rossi-Stuart and Umberto Raho.

The film has been cited as being inspired by Dario Argento's The Bird with the Crystal Plumage, and has been called "entertainingly flamboyant" by one reviewer.

Cast
 Anthony Steffen (English dubbing : Edmund Purdom) as Peter Oliver
 Sylva Koscina as Francoise Bally
 Giacomo Rossi Stuart as Victor Morgan
 Jeanette Len as Giovanna Lenzi
 Umberto Raho
 Renato De Carmine
 Romano Malaspina
 Annabella Incontrera
 Imelde Marani
 Liliana Pavlo
 Irio Fantini

Plot 

Several fashion models are killed by a murderer who poisons a cat's claws with curare. Each victim is given a shawl as a gift, which is laced with a chemical attracting the cat. The first such victim, Paola, had been in a relationship with a blind composer, Peter Oliver (Anthony Steffen) who overhears a conversation he believes may help him track down the killer. Oliver, aided by his butler Burton (Umberto Raho) tracks the cat to its owner Susan (Jeannette Len), who is murdered before she can reveal who has been using the cat. However, the identity of the killer is eventually discovered to be Françoise (Sylva Koscina), the owner of the studio employing the murdered models. Francoise had killed Paola after discovering that her husband Victor (Giacomo Rossi Stuart) had been having an affair with the young model, and had committed the other murders to help cover up the motive for the first killing.

Production 

Production of Sette scialli di seta gialla began on 31 March 1972. The film has been described as part of a "boom" of "imitative whodunits" released after the success of Dario Argento's L'uccello dalle piume di cristallo, along with such films as Una lucertola con la pelle di donna and Los ojos azules de la muñeca rota. Alessandro Continenza and Giovanni Simonelli, who wrote the script alongside director Sergio Pastore, had previously collaborated on the screenplay for the 1966 Spaghetti Western Django spara per primo. The film's title has been noted as one of many giallo titles using either numbers or animal references, having been directly compared to Sette note in nero.

Release 

Sette scialli di seta gialla was released on 12 August 1972 in Italy. The title translates as Seven Shawls of Yellow Silk. It has also been distributed under the title Crimes of the Black Cat.

Critical reception 

Allmovie gave the film a positive review, calling it "an underrated gem" and one of the most "entertainingly flamboyant" giallo films.

Footnotes

References

External links 

 
 

Giallo films
1972 films
Films set in Copenhagen
Films scored by Manuel De Sica
1970s Italian films